Paradise Skypark  is a private use airport located three nautical miles (6 km) south of the central business district of Paradise, in Butte County, California, United States.

It was previously a public use airport with the FAA identifier L24 (formerly P40).

Facilities and aircraft 
The airport covers an area of 35 acres (14 ha) at an elevation of 1,300 feet (396 m) above mean sea level. It has one runway designated 17/35 with an asphalt surface measuring 3,017 by 60 feet (920 x 18 m).

For the 12-month period ending December 31, 2005, the airport had 14,900 aircraft operations, an average of 40 per day: 97% general aviation and 3% air taxi. At that time there were 45 aircraft based at this airport: 98% single-engine, and 2% multi-engine.

References

External links 
 Paradise Skypark
 Aerial image as of September 1998 from USGS The National Map
 

Airports in Butte County, California